Minamoto no Yoshiyasu, also called Ashikaga Yoshiyasu (源 義康/足利 義康, 1127 – 1157) was a samurai of the late Heian period. He is known for his participation in the Hōgen rebellion in 1156. He is best known as the founder of the Ashikaga clan.

Life 
Yoshiyasu was born in 1139, as the son of Minamoto no Yoshikuni.
During the Hōgen rebellion in 1156, he burned one of the Minamoto clan's mansions in Kyoto, and killed Minamoto no Tameyoshi. He was killed shortly after in 1157.

Family
 Father: Minamoto no Yoshikuni
 Mother: daughter of Minamoto no Arifusa

See also 
 Seiwa Genji

External links
 http://www.furugosho.com/moyenage/generalite.htm

References 

1157 deaths
Minamoto clan
People of Heian-period Japan
Year of birth unknown